Asthenotoma juvenilis is an extinct species of sea snails, a marine gastropod mollusc in the family Borsoniidae.

Description

Distribution
This extinct marine species occurred in the Oligocene and Lower Miocene of Aquitaine (Southwest France).

References

 Lozouet P. (2015). Nouvelles espèces de gastéropodes (Mollusca: Gastropoda) de l'Oligocène et du Miocène inférieur d'Aquitaine (Sud-Ouest de la France). Partie 5. Cossmanniana. 17: 15–84-page(s): 42, pl. 18 figs 17–19

Asthenotoma
Prehistoric gastropods
Fossil taxa described in 2015